The 2022 Espirito Santo Trophy took place 24–27 August at Le Golf National and Golf de Saint-Nom-la-Bretèche south-west of Paris, France.

It was the 29th women's golf World Amateur Team Championship for the Espirito Santo Trophy.

Format 
The tournament was a 72-hole stroke play team event. Each team of three players played two rounds at Le Golf National and two rounds at Golf de Saint-Nom-la-Bretèche in different orders. The top teams played their final round on Le Golf National, The best two scores for each round counted towards the team total.

Venues

Course layout

Le Golf National (Albatros Course)

Golf de Saint-Nom-la-Bretèche (Red Course)

Teams 
56 teams entered the event and completed the competition. Each team had three players.

Players in the teams

Winners 
Team Sweden won the Trophy for their third title. Silver medalist and defending champion, team United States, had the same total score, but Sweden was declared the winner. The initial tiebreaker, the final round non-counting score of the respective teams, was in the favor of Sweden, 73 against 74. Team Germany and team Japan shared the bronze on third place one stroke back.

Although there was no official recognition, Meja Örtengren, Sweden, Rose Zhang, United States and Helen Briem, Germany tied for the low individual score at seven-under-par 279.

Results 
Team standings

Individual leaders

There was no official recognition for the lowest individual scores.

See also
 2022 Eisenhower Trophy

References

External links 

World Amateur Team Championships on International Golf Federation website

Espirito Santo Trophy
Golf tournaments in France
Espirito Santo Trophy
Espirito Santo Trophy
Espirito Santo Trophy